The City of Sydney flag is made up of a horizontal triband of three colours – white, gold and blue. It was designed in 1908. The top third of the flag features three designs. The flag is displayed in Town Hall, Sydney.

Description
Per the City of Sydney website:In the top left are the arms belonging to Thomas Townshend, Viscount Sydney, after whom the city was named.

The English Naval Flag in the centre acknowledges the role Arthur Phillip played in Sydney's foundation.

The red cross is overlaid with a globe and two stars, the principal features of James Cook's arms, which were granted as a posthumous honour for his service in mapping Australia.

The arms in the top right belong to the first Lord Mayor of Sydney, Thomas Hughes. It was during his term of office that the title of Mayor became Lord Mayor, and the official coat of arms for the city was granted.

The remaining field of the flag features a ship under full sail, an allusion to the prominence of Sydney as a maritime port.

See also

Coat of arms of Sydney
List of Australian flags

References

External links
 Did you know that Sydney has its own flag?

Sydney
Flag
Flag
Sydney
1908 establishments in Australia
Flags introduced in 1908